The Favret Formation is a Triassic geologic formation. The Favret outcrops in the Augusta, New Pass and Fish Creek ranges of north central Nevada and consists of 600 to 800 feet of limestone, shale and siltstone.

Plesiosaur remains are among the fossils that have been recovered from its strata.

See also

 Plesiosaur stratigraphic distribution

References

Triassic geology of Nevada